Sergey Petrovich Savelyev (February 26, 1948 in Raychikhinsk, Amur Oblast – October 29, 2005 in Moscow) was a Russian cross-country skier who represented the Soviet Union.

Savelyev trained at the Armed Forces sports society in Moscow. He won two medals at the 1976 Winter Olympics in Innsbruck with a gold in the 30 km and a bronze in the 4 × 10 km relay. Savelyev also won the 30 km event at the 1978 FIS Nordic World Ski Championships in Lahti. Savelyev was awarded Order of the Badge of Honor (1976).

Cross-country skiing results
All results are sourced from the International Ski Federation (FIS).

Olympic Games
 2 medals – (1 gold, 1 bronze)

World Championships
 1 medal – (1 gold)

References

External links

Biography 

1948 births
2005 deaths
People from Amur Oblast
Olympic cross-country skiers of the Soviet Union
Olympic gold medalists for the Soviet Union
Olympic bronze medalists for the Soviet Union
Soviet male cross-country skiers
Cross-country skiers at the 1976 Winter Olympics
Cross-country skiers at the 1980 Winter Olympics
Armed Forces sports society athletes
Olympic medalists in cross-country skiing
FIS Nordic World Ski Championships medalists in cross-country skiing
Medalists at the 1976 Winter Olympics
Universiade medalists in cross-country skiing
Universiade bronze medalists for the Soviet Union
Competitors at the 1972 Winter Universiade
Sportspeople from Amur Oblast